The SECR Q1 class was a class of 0-4-4T steam locomotives of the South Eastern and Chatham Railway. The class was rebuilt from older Stirling Q class locomotives by Harry Wainwright between 1903 and 1917 by fitting the boiler that had been designed for the H class 0-4-4T in 1902–03.

Numbering
Fifty-five locomotives were rebuilt at Ashford works, retaining their previous numbers which were scattered between 12 and 423. No. 324 was renumbered 324A in 1907; this and seven others were withdrawn between 1909 and 1914 (the boilers from these being used to rebuild further Q class locomotives to Q1) leaving 47 to enter Southern Railway ownership on 1 January 1923; between 1923 and 1926 all except seven (nos. 134, 141, 344, 354, 366, 413, 419) were repainted into SR green livery and their numbers were prefixed with the letter A to denote Ashford works. Withdrawal recommenced in 1925, and all had been withdrawn by the end of 1930.

References

Q1
0-4-4T locomotives
Railway locomotives introduced in 1903
Scrapped locomotives